Oleg Aleksandrovich Safronov (born 24 February 1967, in Voronezh) is a former Russian football player.

References

1967 births
Sportspeople from Voronezh
Footballers from Voronezh
Living people
Soviet footballers
FC Fakel Voronezh players
FC Dynamo Bryansk players
Russian footballers
Russian Premier League players
FC Arsenal Tula players
FC Kristall Smolensk players

Association football defenders